|}

The Irish St Leger Trial Stakes is a Group 3 flat horse race in Ireland open to thoroughbreds aged three years or older. It is run at the Curragh over a distance of 1 mile and 6 furlongs (2,816 metres), and it is scheduled to take place each year in August.

History
The race was first run in 1995, although its original title of Ballycullen Stakes was used for a much shorter Listed race prior to this. It was held at Leopardstown before switching to the Curragh in 2000.  It was run at Fairyhouse between 2002 and 2005 and also in 2009.

The race became known as the Irish St Leger Trial Stakes in 2011. It was promoted to Group 3 status in 2012.

The race serves as a trial for the following month's Irish St Leger. The last horse to win both races in the same year was Flag of Honour in 2018.

Records
Most successful horse since 1989 (3 wins):
 Order of St George - 2015, 2016, 2017

Leading jockey since 1989 (5 wins):
 Michael Kinane – Cherry Grove Lad (1992), Pre-Eminent (1993), Vintage Crop (1995), Hasanka (2008), Alandi (2009)
 Johnny Murtagh - George Augustus (1991), Royal Rebel (1999), Katiykha (2000), Pugin (2002), Royal Diamond (2013)

Leading trainer since 1989 (8 wins):

 Aidan O'Brien - Tusculum (2006), Leading Light (2014), Order of St George (2015, 2016, 2017), Flag of Honour (2018), Southern France (2019), Delphi (2020)

Winners

Ballycullen Stakes winners since 1989

See also
 Horse racing in Ireland
 List of Irish flat horse races

References

 Racing Post:

 pedigreequery.com – Ballycullen Stakes – Curragh.
 ifahonline.org International Federation of Horseracing Authorities – Irish St Leger Trial Stakes (2019).

Flat races in Ireland
Curragh Racecourse
Open long distance horse races